Anaplectoides is a genus of moths of the family Noctuidae.

Species
 Anaplectoides brunneomedia McDunnough, 1946
 Anaplectoides colorata (Corti & Draudt, 1933)
 Anaplectoides fuscivirens Sugi, 1995
 Anaplectoides inexpectata Dierl, 1983
 Anaplectoides inouei Plante, 1987
 Anaplectoides magnifica (Moore, 1882)
 Anaplectoides perviridis (Warren, 1912)
 Anaplectoides phaeotaenia Boursin, 1955
 Anaplectoides prasina – green arches ([Schiffermüller], 1775)
 Anaplectoides pressus (Grote, 1874)
 Anaplectoides semivirens Ronkay & Ronkay, 1999
 Anaplectoides tamsi Boursin, 1955
 Anaplectoides virens (Butler, 1878)

References
 Anaplectoides at Markku Savela's Lepidoptera and some other life forms
 Natural History Museum Lepidoptera genus database

Noctuinae
Noctuoidea genera